Radosław Gołębiowski (born 24 November 2001) is a Polish professional footballer who plays as a midfielder for I liga side Skra Częstochowa, on loan from Widzew Łódź.

Career statistics

Club

References

External links

2001 births
Living people
Sportspeople from Częstochowa
Polish footballers
Association football midfielders
Skra Częstochowa players
Widzew Łódź players
II liga players
I liga players
Poland youth international footballers